The Portrait of Princess Saint Joana is a painting attributed to Portuguese Renaissance artist Nuno Gonçalves. It is believed to have been painted during the time when Joanna, Princess of Portugal was regent for her father, Afonso V of Portugal.

References

Sources
IMC-IP Retrato da Princesa Santa Joana

1470s paintings
Paintings by Nuno Gonçalves
Portraits of women
Cultural depictions of princesses